Cunning folk traditions, sometimes referred to as folk magic, were intertwined with the early culture and practice of the Latter Day Saint movement.  These traditions were widespread in unorganized religion in the parts of Europe and America where the Latter Day Saint movement began in the 1820s and 1830s.  Practices of the culture included folk healing, folk medicine, folk magic, and divination, remnants of which have been incorporated or rejected to varying degrees into the liturgy, culture, and practice of modern Latter Day Saints.

Early church leaders were tolerant of these traditions, but by the beginning of the 20th century folk practices were not considered part of the orthopraxy of most branches of the movement, including the Church of Jesus Christ of Latter-day Saints (LDS Church).  The extent that the founder of the movement Joseph Smith and his early followers participated in the culture has been the subject of controversy since before the church's founding in 1830, and continues to this day.

Joseph Smith family

The Smith family practiced a form of folk religion, which, although not uncommon in this time and place, was criticized by many contemporary Protestants "as either fraudulent illusion or the workings of the Devil." Both Joseph Smith Sr. and at least two of his sons worked at "money digging," using seer stones in mostly unsuccessful attempts to locate lost items and buried treasure. In a draft of her memoirs, Lucy Mack Smith referred to folk magic:I shall change my theme for the present, but let not my reader suppose that because I shall pursue another topic for a season that we stopt our labor and went at trying to win the faculty of Abrac, drawing magic circles or soothsaying, to the neglect of all kinds of business. We never during our lives suffered one important interest to swallow up every other obligation. But whilst we worked with our hands, we endeavored to remember the service of and the welfare of our souls. D. Michael Quinn has written that Lucy Mack Smith viewed these magical practices as "part of her family's religious quest" while denying that they prevented "family members from accomplishing other, equally important work."  Jan Shipps notes that while Smith's "religious claims were rejected by many of the persons who had known him in the 1820s because they remembered him as a practitioner of the magic arts," others of his earliest followers were attracted to his claims "for precisely the same reason."

Smith reports using seer stones in the translation of the Book of Mormon, as well as in the reception of several early revelations in the Doctrine and Covenants.

Treasure-seeking activities

From about 1819, Smith regularly practiced scrying, a form of divination in which a "seer" looked into a seer stone to receive supernatural knowledge. Smith usually practiced "peeping" or seeing by putting a stone at the bottom of a white stovepipe hat, putting his face over the hat to block the light, then divining information from the stone.  Smith and his father achieved "something of a mysterious local reputation in the profession—mysterious because there is no record that they ever found anything despite the readiness of some local residents to pay for their efforts."

In late 1825, Josiah Stowell, a well-to-do farmer from South Bainbridge, Chenango County, New York, who had been searching for a lost Spanish mine near Harmony Township, Susquehanna County, Pennsylvania with another seer, traveled to Manchester to hire Smith "on account of having heard that he possessed certain keys, by which he could discern things invisible to the natural eye."

Visit of Angel Moroni
Smith said that on the night of Sunday, September 21, 1823, an angel visited him and told him of the location of the gold plates that contained the Book of Mormon.  While Smith is not known to have explicitly assigned significance to the date, it has been noted that September 21 was an especially auspicious night in astrological terms, being a full moon, and autumnal equinox.

Mars Dagger
Hyrum Smith inherited and passed down several relics to his descendents. These include a "Mars Dagger", Mars being the ruling planet of Joseph Smith Sr.'s birth year. Inscribed on one side of the dagger is the astrological symbol for mars, the occult seal of Mars, and "Adonay", a Hebrew word for "God". On the blade of the dagger is the zodiacal sign of Scorpio. Specially consecrated daggers or swords were often prescribed when drawing magic circles. Several factors lead scholars to believe that the dagger originally belonged to Joseph Smith Sr.: Palmyra residents where the Smith family resided did not mention Hyrum as a participant in the frequent treasure digs that Joseph Smith Jr. and his father participated in, sources frequently mention Joseph Smith Sr. and his son Joseph Smith Jr. drawing magic circles, the astrological signs on the dagger belonged to Joseph Smith Sr. not Hyrum, and Joseph Sr. ordained Hyrum as the a patriarch on his deathbed making him a natural heir of family heirlooms.

Amulets, Charms and Talismans

Amulets, charms and talismans were part of the religious environment of the Smith family and other early Latter Day Saints.

Joseph Smith possessed a "Jupiter Talisman," a silver coin shaped device that would have been worn on Smith's body to grant "decisive victory over enemies, to defend against machinations, and to inspire the wearer thereof with the most remarkable confidence." The design of the talisman matches exactly those found in an 1801 grimoire titled The Magus Family lore had it that Smith had it on his body the day of his martyrdom.

Smith, and then later Brigham Young, also owned a silver "Masonic Dove Medallion," which is inscribed on the back "Fortitude Lodge No. 42." This masonic lodge was based out of New Brunswick, Canada, and it is unclear how it arrived into Smith's possession, as there are no known connections with that lodge early Latter Day Saints. Additionally, a dove was not a common Masonic symbol in the early 1800s. The medallion was transferred to Brigham Young and then Historian D. Michael Quinn has suggested that the medallion could possibly be a charm associated with Venus, given the medallion is silver as prescribed in magic books and a dove is a symbol for Venus.

Brigham Young accepted the efficacy of seer stones, healing amulets and witches. Young had a bloodstone that according to his niece he wore around his neck on a chain for protection "when going into unknown or dangerous places."

Divining Rods
Both Joseph Smith Jr. and his father used divining rods.

One of Joseph Smith's early revelations, now canonized in the Doctrine and Covenants, stated that Oliver Cowdery had the power to use a divining rod. Cowdery was told that he had the gift of "working with the sprout, behold it hath told you things. Behold there is no other power save God that can cause this thing of Nature<sic> to work in your hands." Wording was changed in later editions of the Doctrine and Covenants  referring to Cowdery's rod as the "gift of Aaron". The term "sprout" was often used to describe divining rods in the 1820s and '30s.

Purportedly, Brigham Young used Cowdery's rod to mark the site of the Salt Lake Temple Apostle Anthon H. Lund wrote in his diary:

In the revelation to Oliver Cowdery in May 1829, Bro. [B. H.] Roberts said that the gift which the Lord says he has in his hand meant a stick which was like Aaron’s Rod. It is said Bro. Phineas Young [brother-in-law of Oliver Cowdery and brother of Brigham Young] got it from him [Cowdery] and gave it to President Young who had it with him when he arrived in this [Salt Lake] valley and that it was with that stick that he pointed out where the Temple should be built.

In 1843, James C. Brewster, who had formed a splinter group, claimed that in 1836 prior to an Ohio treasure quest, that presiding Patriarch Joseph Smith Sr. "anointed the mineral rods and seeing stones with consecrated oil, and prayed over them in the house of the Lord in Kirtland."

Heber C. Kimball was given a three and a half foot rod by Joseph Smith, with which he practiced rhabdomancy, believing "all he had to do was kneel down with rod in his hands and ... sometimes the Lord would answer his questions" by causing the rod to move. According to Kimball, he would ask yes-no questions, movement meant "yes" and no movement meant "no". His use of the rod for divining continued until at least 1862.

Apostle Willard Richards had a black cane that he used to lay on people's head who had a sickness in order to heal them "through the power of God."

Coffin Canes
When Joseph and Hyrum were killed in 1844, the bloodstained wooden boxes used to transport the body of Joseph Smith was cut up into a number of canes. Smith's body was exhumed seven months later to a different burial site, and the coffin used for transport then was also made into canes. Some of the canes were made from leftover wood from the burial coffins. Owners of these canes included Brigham Young, Wilford Woodruff, Willard Snow, Perrigrine Sessions, Philo Dibble, James Bird, William S. Wadsworth, Heber C. Kimball, Lucius Scovil, Sidney Rigdon, and Dimick B. Huntington. Rigdon's was given to him after he had been excommunicated in 1845 in a magnanimous gesture by Brigham Young.

Various Latter Day Saints attested to the healing properties of these canes. In an 1857 sermon, Kimball stated that "the day will come when there will be multitudes who will be healed and blessed through the instrumentality of those canes, and the devil cannot overcome those who have them, in consequence of their faith and confidence in the virtues connected with them."

Seer Stones

In the early 1820s in the region where Joseph Smith grew up there was a subculture that practiced cunning folk traditions, including scrying through the use of "seer stones" or "peep stones".  Smith's hometown of Palmyra was no exception.  Historian D. Michael Quinn states “Until the Book of Mormon thrust young Smith into prominence, Palmyra’s most notable seer was Sally Chase, who used a greenish-colored stone. William Stafford also had a seer stone, and Joshua Stafford had a ‘peepstone which looked like white marble and had a hole through the center.'” Historian Richard Bushman adds Chauncy Hart, and an unnamed man in Susquehanna County, both of whom had stones with which they found lost objects.

Smith's early use of seer stones is well documented but the provenance of each stone and the timeline are unclear. One account describes him borrowing the seer stone of a local girl, possibly Sally Chase, and using it to find his own first stone.

Joseph Smith's mother records that Sally Chase's abilities as a seer were used by locals to try to find and steal the gold plates from Joseph after he had obtained them. "A young woman by the name Chase (Sister to Willard Chase) found a green glass, through which she could see many very wonderful things, and, among her great discoveries, she said that she saw, the precise place where 'Joe. Smith kept his gold Bible hid.' And, obedient to her directions, they gathered their forces and laid siege to the cooper shop."

Hiram Page, one of the Eight Witnesses of the Book of Mormon, was living with his in-laws the Whitmers in Fayette, New York. Smith arrived in August 1830 to discover Page using a black "seer stone" to produce revelations for the church. The revelations were regarding the organization and location of Zion. Cowdery and the Whitmer family believed the revelations were authentic. In response, Smith announced in a new revelation during the church's September conference that Page's revelations were of the devil (Doctrine and Covenants). At the conference there was considerable discussion on the topic. Page agreed to discard the stone and the revelations and join in following Smith as the sole revelator for the church. The members present confirmed this unanimously with a vote. The fate of the stone and revelations was not recorded by contemporary sources and has been the subject of interest ever since.  Martin Harris's brother Emer stated second-hand in 1856 that the stone was ground to powder and the associated revelations were burned.  Apostle Alvin R. Dyer stated that he had discovered Page's seerstone in 1955, that it had been passed down through Jacob Whitmer's family. The validity of this claim has been questioned.

A young woman living at the home of David Whitmer in Ohio in 1838 reported receiving a number of revelations about the downfall of Joseph Smith by looking through a black stone that she had found. Some disaffected church members followed after her.

In 1841, apostles Wilford Woodruff and George A. Smith confiscated several seer stones and grimoires from convert William Mountford in Staffordshire, England. The grimoires were destroyed and seer stones were sent to Nauvoo. Joseph Smith examined the stones and stated that they were "Urim and Thummim as good as ever was upon the earth" but that they had been "consecrated to devils."

Astrology

LDS Church members' views towards astrology ranged from acceptance to hostility, but were generally ambivalent, views reflected in the church's leadership.  For example, Orson Pratt condemned it, while William Clayton openly sought advice from astrologers into the 1860s. In 1852, Brigham Young gave his approval to a convert to study and begin practicing astrology, only to change his recommendation a year later, calling it "a dangerous thing to meddle with".

William W. Phelps published an almanac in Utah from 1851 to 1866.  The first edition did not include the standard astrological information expected of almanacs, calling them "matters of ancient fancy".  Later editions did, even while criticizing their effectiveness, an indication that there was a demand for it. Phelps wrote and spoke often against astrology, but by 1857, after Brigham Young told him that astrology was true, Phelps changed his mind, believing instead that astrology was "one of the sciences belonging to the holy Priesthood perverted by vain man." By 1861, Young himself seems to have changed his mind about the utility of astrology, telling an individual who wanted to start an astrology school that, "it would not do to favor Astrology.

In 1868, the Salt Lake School of the Prophets decided that "Astrology was in opposition to the work of God. Hence saints should not be engaged in it," which was followed up with an article in the Deseret News decrying it. From that time on astrology has been considered an unacceptable practice.

One notable post-1868 exception was John Steele, who practiced astrology into the 20th century while in good standing with the church in Parowan and Toquerville, taking local leadership positions and eventually being called as a patriarch in 1903. Steele was an early pioneer and worked as the town's preeminent doctor. He was known for the way that he integrated medicine, magic, and astrology. He practiced according to the ideas of Samuel Thomson. One of Thomson's theories was that elimination of toxins was key to curing patients; calomel was sometimes used to induce vomiting. Because Steele's son Robert Henry was killed by calomel, Steele preferred Thomson's herbal medicines. He considered himself a veterinarian, using an herbal "horse taming" mixture, and was known for his ability to set broken bones. He was also known for using black magic to fix problems and people in the town solicited him for horoscopes. He was called "Doc", and he was often seen wearing a blue cape with red lining. He also carried a cane and rode a horse named Charlie.  While practicing as a doctor, Steele still maintained a shoemaking business.

See also

 List of references to seer stones in the Latter Day Saint movement history
 Phrenology and the Latter Day Saint movement
 Salamander letter
 The Magus (book)

Notes

Works cited

 
 

 
 
 
 
 
 
 

 
 

History of the Latter Day Saint movement
Joseph Smith
Mormonism-related controversies
Latter Day Saint movement
Mormon folklore
Seership in Mormonism